The 1948 Arkansas Razorbacks football team represented the University of Arkansas in the Southwest Conference (SWC) during the 1948 college football season. In their third year under head coach John Barnhill, the Razorbacks compiled a 5–5 record (2–4 against SWC opponents), finished in fifth place in the SWC, and outscored their opponents by a combined total of 227 to 136.

For the first time since 1932, the Razorbacks did not travel to Skelly Stadium, and instead played Tulsa in the new War Memorial Stadium in Little Rock.  Arkansas running back Clyde Scott was named a consensus All-American and led the team with 670 rushing yards on 95 carries (7.1 yards per carry). Gordon Long lead the Razorbacks in passing, completing 32 of 56 passes for 449 yards. Ross Pritchard led the team in receiving with 17 catches for 311 yards.

Schedule

References

Arkansas
Arkansas Razorbacks football seasons
Arkansas Razorbacks football